The Book of Lamentations (from its incipit meaning "how") is a collection of poetic laments for the destruction of Jerusalem in 586 BCE. In the Hebrew Bible it appears in the Ketuvim ("Writings") as one of the Five Megillot (or "Five Scrolls") alongside the Song of Songs, Book of Ruth, Ecclesiastes and the Book of Esther although there is no set order.  In the Christian Old Testament it follows the Book of Jeremiah, as the prophet Jeremiah is its traditional author. However, according to modern scholarship, while the destruction of Jerusalem by Babylon in 586/7 BCE forms the background to the poems, they were probably not written by Jeremiah. Most likely, each of the book's chapters was written by a different anonymous poet, and they were then joined to form the book.

Some motifs of a traditional Mesopotamian "city lament" are evident in this book, such as mourning the desertion of the city by God, its destruction, and the ultimate return of the divinity; others "parallel the funeral dirge in which the bereaved bewails... and... addresses the [dead]". The tone is bleak: God does not speak, the degree of suffering is presented as overwhelming, and expectations of future redemption are minimal. Nonetheless, the author repeatedly makes clear that the city (and even the author himself) had profusely sinned against God, to which God had strongly responded. In doing so the author does not blame God but rather presents him as righteous, just and sometimes even as merciful.

Summary
The book consists of five separate (and non-chronological) poems. In the first (chapter 1), the city sits as a desolate weeping widow overcome with miseries. In chapter 2, these miseries are described in connection with national sins and acts of God. Chapter 3 speaks of hope for the people of God: that the chastisement would only be for their good; a better day would dawn for them. Chapter 4 laments the ruin and desolation of the city and temple, but traces it to the people's sins. Chapter 5 is a prayer that Zion's reproach may be taken away in the repentance and recovery of the people.

Themes
It reflects the  view, traceable to Sumerian literature of a thousand years earlier, that the destruction of the holy city was a punishment by God for the communal sin of its people. However, while Lamentations is generically similar to the Sumerian laments of the early 2nd millennium BCE (e.g., "Lamentation over the Destruction of Ur," "Lament for Sumer and Ur," "Nippur Lament"), the Sumerian laments (that we have) were recited on the occasion of the rebuilding of a temple, so their story has a happy ending, whereas the book of Lamentations was written before the return/rebuilding, and thus contains only lamentations and pleas to God with no response or resolution.

Beginning with the reality of disaster, Lamentations concludes with the bitter possibility that God may have finally rejected Israel (chapter 5:22). Sufferers in the face of grief are not urged to a confidence in the goodness of God; in fact, God is accountable for the disaster. The poet acknowledges that this suffering is a just punishment, still God is held to have had choice over whether to act in this way and at this time. Hope arises from a recollection of God's past goodness, but although this justifies a cry to God to act in deliverance, there is no guarantee that he will. Repentance will not persuade God to be gracious, since he is free to give or withhold grace as he chooses. In the end, the possibility is that God has finally rejected his people and may not again deliver them. Nevertheless, it also affirms confidence that the mercies of Yahweh (the God of Israel) never end, but are new every morning (3:22–33).

Structure 

Lamentations consists of five distinct (and non-chronological) poems, corresponding to its five chapters. Two of its defining characteristic features are the alphabetic acrostic and its  meter. However, few English translations capture either of these; even fewer attempt to capture both.

Acrostic
The first four chapters are written as acrostics. Chapters 1, 2, and 4 each have 22 verses, corresponding to the 22 letters of the Hebrew alphabet, the first lines beginning with the first letter of the alphabet, the second with the second letter, and so on. Chapter 3 has 66 verses, so that each letter begins three lines. Unlike standard alphabetical order, in the middle chapters of Lamentations, the letter  (the 17th letter) comes before  (the 16th). In the first chapter, the Masoretic text uses the standard/modern alphabetical order; however, in the dead sea scroll version of the text (4QLam/4Q111), even the first chapter uses the  order found in chapters 2, 3, and 4.

This  order may be based on the pre-exilic Paleo-Hebrew alphabet/script in which  did indeed come before  (as is reflected in pre-exilic abecedaries and other texts). The  before  order (which is found in other ancient western Semitic alphabets as far back as the 13th century BCE) was likely adopted by the Judeans at some point in the exilic or post-exilic period. Given that they largely abandoned the Paleo-Hebrew script for the Aramaic script (which used ), it is not surprising that they also adopted the Aramaic letter order (around the same (exilic) time period). The fact that Lamentations follows the pre-exilic  order is evidence for the position that they are not postexilic compositions but rather written shortly after the events described.

The fifth poem, corresponding to the fifth chapter, is not acrostic but still has 22 lines.

English translations that attempt to capture this acrostic nature are few in number. They include those by Ronald Knox and by David R. Slavitt. In both cases their mapping of the 22 Hebrew letters into the Latin alphabet's 26 uses 'A' to 'V' (omitting W, X, Y and Z), thus lacking the "A to Z" sense of completeness.

The book's first four chapters have a well-defined qinah rhythm of three stresses followed by two, although the fifth chapter lacks this. Dobbs-Allsopp describes this meter as "the rhythmic dominance of unbalanced and enjambed lines". Again, few English translations attempt to capture this.  Exceptions include Robert Alter's The Hebrew Bible and the New American Bible Revised Edition.

Composition

Lamentations has traditionally been ascribed to Jeremiah. The ascription of authorship to Jeremiah derives from the impetus to ascribe all biblical books to inspired biblical authors, and Jeremiah being a prophet at the time who prophesied its demise was an obvious choice. Additionally in 2 Chronicles 35:25 Jeremiah is said to have composed a lament on the death of King Josiah, but there is no reference to Josiah in the book of Lamentations and no reason to connect it to Jeremiah. However, the modern consensus amongst scholars is that Jeremiah did not write Lamentations; like most ancient literature, the author remains anonymous. Most likely, each of the book's chapters was written by a different poet, and they then were joined to form the book.

The book's language fits an Exilic date (586–520 BCE), and the poems probably originated from Judeans who remained in the land. The fact that the acrostics follow the  order of the pre-exilic Paleo-Hebrew alphabet/script further supports the position that they are not postexilic compositions. However, the sequence of the chapters is not chronological, and the poems were not necessarily written by eyewitnesses to the events. The book was compiled between 586 BCE and the end of the 6th century BCE, when the Temple was rebuilt. Because Second Isaiah, whose work is dated to 550—538 BCE, seems to have known at least parts of Lamentations, the book was probably in circulation by the mid-6th century, but the exact time, place, and reason for its composition are unknown.

Scholars are divided over whether the book is the work of one or multiple authors. One clue pointing to multiple authors is that the gender and situation of the first-person witness changes – the narration is feminine in the first and second lamentation, and masculine in the third, while the fourth and fifth are eyewitness reports of Jerusalem's destruction; conversely, the similarities of style, vocabulary, and theological outlook, as well as the uniform historical setting, are arguments for one author.

Later interpretation and influence
Lamentations is recited annually by Jews on the fast day of Tisha B'Av ("Ninth of Av") (July–August), mourning the destruction of both the First Temple (by the Babylonians in 586 BCE) and the Second Temple (by the Romans in 70 CE).

In Christian tradition, readings from Lamentations are part of the Holy Week liturgies.

In the Church of England, readings are used at Morning and Evening Prayer on the Monday and Tuesday of Holy Week, and at Evening Prayer on Good Friday.

In the Coptic Orthodox Church, the book's third chapter is chanted on the 12th hour of the Good Friday service, that commemorates the burial of Jesus.

Citations

Bibliography

External links

 Jewish translations:
 Lamentations with multiple translations of the text & Rashi's commentary, as well as numerous other classic Hebrew commentaries at Sefaria.org
 Book of Lamentations with Hebrew/English and MP3 chanting of the entire book in Hebrew. (Website also contains other books of the bible.)
 Laments (R. David Seidenberg): a fresh translation with linear Hebrew and English, on neohasid.org
 A synopsis of Eichah's chapters
 Christian translations:
 Lamentations at Sacred Texts KJV, Tan, Sep, Vul
  Various versions
 Translations maintaining acrostic structure
 Knox Translation (22 letters: A to V, omitting W to Z)
 Translations maintaining metrical rhythm (qinah)
 New American Bible Revised Edition (NABRE)
 Translations maintaining both acrostics and qinah
 ServiceMusic translation (22 letters: A to Z, omitting four intermediate letters)

 
6th-century BC books
Jeremiah
Lamentations, Book of
Tisha B'Av
Laments
Major prophets